The Virginia House of Delegates election of 1995 was held on Tuesday, November 7.

Results

Overview 

Source

See also 
 1995 United States elections
 1995 Virginia elections
 1995 Virginia Senate election

References 

House of Delegates
Virginia
Virginia House of Delegates elections